Karay-a may refer to:

 Karay-a people of the Philippines
 Karay-a language, spoken by the Karay-a people

Language and nationality disambiguation pages